Pasión de Amor is a 2015 Philippine romantic drama television series based on the 2003 Colombian telenovela Pasión de Gavilanes starring Mario Cimarro, Danna García, Juan Alfonso Baptista, Paola Rey, Michel Brown and Natasha Klauss, produced by Telemundo Internacional and R.T.I. Colombia. Directed by Eric Quizon, it is topbilled by Jake Cuenca, Arci Muñoz, Ejay Falcon, Ellen Adarna, Joseph Marco, Coleen Garcia, Wendell Ramos, Teresa Loyzaga and Dante Ponce. The series premiered on ABS-CBN's Primetime Bida evening block and worldwide on The Filipino Channel from June 1, 2015, to February 26, 2016, replacing Inday Bote and was replaced by We Will Survive.

This show that launches the main villains: Gabriella(Teresa Loyzaga), a cunning and evil mother of Elizondo sisters, Lazaro(Dante Ponce), a syndicate leader and Gabriel(Wendell Ramos), a powerful henchman to make the Samonte brothers and Elizondo sisters hellish.

The story revolves around the Samonte brothers who set out to avenge the death of their youngest sister. They do this by making the Elizondo sisters fall in love with them.

Plot
Follow the story of the Samonte family: Juan (Jake Cuenca), Oca (Ejay Falcon), Cocoy (Joseph Marco), and Lyvia (Ingrid dela Paz). Juan, being the eldest, wanted to provide a better life for his family after their parents died. Little did Juan and his brothers know that Olivia was seeing a much older and wealthy man, Bernardo Elizondo (Ronaldo Valdez). When Bernardo's wife, Gabriela (Teresa Loyzaga), finds out about his affair, she hires men to kill Olivia. When Olivia was brutally raped and murdered, Juan and his brothers will stop at nothing to bring justice to her death.

The Samonte brothers will infiltrate the household of the Elizondos, the family Juan suspects is responsible for what happened to Lyvia. There, Juan will meet Gabriela — the powerful matriarch, and Norma (Arci Muñoz) — the mysterious eldest daughter who has unwittingly captured his interest.

The more he spends time with the family, the more he's sure of Gabriela's guilt. But her daughters, Norma in particular, will protect their family and their mother no matter what. Juan must think of a way to get closer to the truth he's so desperately seeking, and the only way he finds is to make Norma fall in love. As time passes they have to fight for their love under the dangers caused by Gabriel Salcedo (Wendell Ramos), Gabriela's illegitimate son, and tries to succeed but as Juan and Norma get married along with Oca and Sari (Ellen Adarna) and Cocoy and Jamie (Coleen Garcia), they suffered in the hands of Gabriel during their honeymoon and succeeds in killing Jamie. Gabriel kidnaps Oca and Sari and the rest including JD and plants a bomb in the cave at first they succeed but they got caught causing Norma to have an accident in order for her and Juan’s son to escape. As for Gabriela, she teams up with them to destroy her son to stop his plan and kills both Gabriel and his father, Lazaro, in order to be safe. Norma is sent to the hospital to recover but as the doctors stated that Norma will die causing Gabriela to redeem her soul and regret her sins. At the hospital lobby, the Elizondos and Samontes are visited by a young image of the Elizondos father, Bernardo, and gives his daughter her life back and gives a chance of redemption of their mistakes, as a sign of Gabriela's sorrowful cries and hopes of a new hope. Two years later, they finally lived a peaceful life after all the struggles and hardships in the past years and Juan remembers his promise to his father for being the eldest he must be ready to protect his loved ones.

Cast and characters

Main cast
 Jake Cuenca as Juancho "Juan" A. Samonte / Juan Reyes -  Oscar, Franco's and Lyvia's older brother, Norma's husband and JD's father , Jamie and Sari's brother in law.
 Arci Muñoz as Norma S. Elizondo-Samonte - Bernardo and Gabriela's eldest daughter. Sari and Jamie's older sister , Juan's wife and JD's mother . Oscar and Franco's sister in law.
 Ejay Falcon as Oscar “Oca” A. Samonte / Oscar Santos - Juan's younger brother, Franco and Lyvia's older brother, Sari's husband . Jamie and Norma's brother in law, and uncle of JD.
 Ellen Adarna as Sarita "Sari" S. Elizondo-Samonte - Bernardo and Gabriela's second daughter . Jamie’s older sister and Norma's younger sister . Oscar's wife . Juan and Franco's sister in law , Aunt of JD.
 Joseph Marco as Franco “Cocoy” A. Samonte - Juan and Oscar's younger brother, Lyvia's older brother . Jamie's husband . Norma and Sari's brother in law . uncle of JD.
 Coleen García as Jimena "Jamie" S. Elizondo-Samonte † - Bernardo and Gabriela's youngest daughter , Norma and Sari's younger sister . Franco's wife . Juan and Oscar's sister in law . aunt of JD .

Supporting cast
 Enzo Andrei de Castro as Juan David "JD" E. Samonte - Norma and Juan's son. 
 Dante Ponce as Lazaro Madrigal† - father of gabriel , inlove with Gabriela and when an incident happen with Gabriela , everyone thought gabriela has been dead but for some reason Lazaro hide her in to an island and  rape her.
 Wendell Ramos as Gabriel S. Madrigal †- Gabriela's black sheep son . a powerful henchman who will make the lives of the Samonte brothers and Elizondo sisters hellish .
 Teresa Loyzaga as Doña Gabriela Salcedo-Elizondo / Gabriela Salcedo-Madrigal - Norma , Sarita and Jimena's cunning and evil mother .
 Ahron Villena as Fernando Madrigal †- Norma's ex fiancee . He's inlove with Gabriela later in the series he was killed by gabriela by ordering Gabriel to poison him.
 Michelle Madrigal as Lucia "Cia" Espejo - Juan, Oscar , Franco 's childhood friend . Gabriel's girlfriend with a twist , She need to make Gabriel fall in love to her , to make an eye for the Samonte brothers , to know Gabriel's plan.
 Pen Medina as Maryo "Mayor" Adriano - Elle's uncle . 
 Pilar Pilapil as Maria Eduvina Suarez†
 Kazel Kinouchi as Eliza "Elle" Adriano
 Daria Ramirez as Eva Rodriguez
 Aubrey Miles as Rosario "DJ Rio" Montes-Burgos
 Zeppi Borromeo as Dos Roque Alvarez, Jr.
 Jojo Riguerra as Pepito "Ping" Canlas
 Marco Lumba as Mike Galvez
 Cara Eriguel as Detective Anna Miranda

Guest cast
Carlos Morales as Mattheus
Nathaniel Britt as Kiko Rodriguez
Jae Cochon as Daniella Salcedo Madrigal
Benj Bolivar as Miggy
June Macasaet as Mike
Denisse Aguilar as Paula
Natalia Moon as Dancer at Bridal Shower
 Akiko Solon as Lucy
Josh Ivan Morales as Norma's rapist
Dionne Monsanto as KC
Alex Castro as Architect Gelo Corpuz 
Paolo Rivero as Foreman
Aiko Climaco as Marga
Menggie Cobarrubias as Eduvina's doctor
Judy Saril as Barbie
Hazel Faith dela Cruz as Agnes
Jocelyn Medina as Mrs. Chavez
Hannah Ledesma as Claire
Jonic Magno as Atty. Lopez

Special participation
Ronaldo Valdez as Don Bernardo Elizondo - Gabriela Salcedo's husband; Norma, Sarita and Jamie's father; Lyvia Samonte's lover
Ingrid dela Paz as Olivia "Lyvia" Samonte - Juan, Oscar and Franco's youngest sister; Don Bernardo Elizondo's lover
Lorenzo Mara as Orlando Samonte - Juan, Oscar, Franco, and Lyvia's father
Yayo Aguila as Leonora Alvarez-Samonte - Orlando Samonte's wife; Juan, Oscar, Franco and Lyvia's mother
Dominic Ochoa as Carlos Suarez
Dimples Romana as young Eduvina Suarez
AJ Dee as Daniel Burgos

Special finale participation
Alex Gonzaga as Jenny

Scheduling
Initially meant to be part of ABS-CBN's Kapamilya Gold afternoon block, based on the first teaser, declaring that Pasión de Amor will be airing on Kapamilya Gold in May 2015. But on a last minute change — due to other network's shows currently airing on the said block (two other teleseryes, Koreanovela Let's Get Married and soon to be successor Pinoy Big Brother: 737 Gold). However, the timeslot was later announced as part of Primetime Bida evening block and finally aired on June 1, 2015, after the network decided to immediately end Inday Bote until May 29, 2015, due to low ratings and lack of support. The schedule time is before TV Patrol.

Reception

Ratings

See also
Pasión de gavilanes
List of ABS-CBN drama series
List of programs aired by Jeepney TV

References

External links
 

ABS-CBN drama series
Philippine romance television series
2015 Philippine television series debuts
2016 Philippine television series endings
Philippine television series based on telenovelas
Philippine television series based on Colombian television series
Filipino-language television shows
Television shows set in the Philippines